The Excalibur is an American two seats-in-tandem, high wing, pusher configuration ultralight aircraft that is manufactured in kit form for amateur construction, by Excalibur Aircraft of Sebring, Florida. It was introduced in 1993.

The Excalibur is available in the US amateur-built and light-sport aircraft categories and in Canada in the amateur-built, BULA and AULA categories. In Europe it qualifies under the Fédération Aéronautique Internationale microlight rules.

Design and development
The Excalibur was designed as "clone" of the Quad City Challenger II aircraft. The company took the basic Challenger design and incorporated many changes, including mounting the engine upright allowing larger propellers and the Rotax gearbox to be mounted, lengthening the tailboom and enlarging the tail vertical surface to increase stability, shortening the ailerons and replacing control cables with torque tubes. The optional Dacron covering on the Challenger was replaced with Superflite standard aircraft fabric, the fuselage was lengthened to give more backseat room and the nosecone was reduced in size to provide better over-the-nose visibility. The design was also streamlined to reduce drag and round cross-section wing struts were replaced with aerodynamic extrusions. The Challenger's rigid landing gear was replaced with a bungee-suspended system.

Regarding the landing gear improvements reviewer Andre Cliche, author of the Ultralight Aircraft Shopper's Guide,  said:

Variants
Excalibur
Basic model with  Rotax 503,  Rotax 582,  Hirth 3503,  Hirth 3203 or the  Hirth 3202 two-stroke engines. 750 completed and flown by the end of 2011.
Excalibur Four Stroke
Model with HKS 700E  or  Jabiru 2200  four-stroke engines. 400 completed and flown by the end of 2011.
Excalibur Wide Body (Stretch)
Model with wider fuselage, also called the Excalibur Stretch. 750 completed and flown by the end of 2011.

Specifications (Excalibur)

See also

References

External links

1990s United States ultralight aircraft
Light-sport aircraft
Single-engined pusher aircraft